Oe with macron (Ө̄ ө̄; italics: Ө̄ ө̄) is a letter of the Cyrillic script.

Oe with macron is used in the Negidal, Orok and Selkup languages to represent a long close-mid central rounded vowel /ɵː/.

See also
Cyrillic characters in Unicode

Cyrillic letters with diacritics
Letters with macron